Calm Before the Storm is the fifth studio album by British heavy metal band Venom. The original title of the album would have been Deadline, but the title was changed when guitarist Jeffrey "Mantas" Dunn left the band and was replaced by Jimi Clare and Mike Hickey. Both were to follow bassist Conrad "Cronos" Lant in his later solo career and the latter would also return on the 2006 album Metal Black.

The album is characterised by a "cleaner", more synthetic sound when compared to Venom's other albums. Especially the drums, which sound almost like a drum machine, are contributing to this fact. Also, the guitar has a brighter sound and is easily distinguishable from the bass. The change in sound is perhaps mostly due to the addition of another guitarist and the producer Nick Tauber, who had previously worked with hard rock acts such as UFO and Thin Lizzy.

Track listing
All tracks by Conrad Lant unless noted.

Personnel
Venom
Cronos – vocals, bass
Mike "Mykus" Hickey – guitar
James Clare – guitar, keyboards, backing vocals
Abaddon – drums, backing vocals

Production
Nick Tauber – producer
Keith Nichol, Andy Lovell – engineers
Stuart Brown, Nigel Broad – assistant engineers
Aaron Chakraverty – mastering

References

Venom (band) albums
1987 albums